Daniel is a New French restaurant located at 60 East 65th Street (between  Madison Avenue and Park Avenue), on the Upper East Side in Manhattan, in New York City.  It is owned and run by French celebrity chef Daniel Boulud, New York's longest-reigning four-star chef. The restaurant moved to its current location in early 1999.

Since 2013, Ghaya Oliveira has been the executive pastry chef.

Ratings
Since 1999, Daniel has been a AAA Five Star Award winner.

Since 2002, Daniel has been a recipient of the Wine Spectator Grand Award.

In 2013, Zagats gave it a food rating of 28 (the second-highest rating on the Upper East Side), and decor and service ratings of 28 (each the highest on the Upper East Side).  It ranked it the 4th-best restaurant in New York City.

In 2012, The Infatuation gave it a rating of 8.9/10 and included it on their 2020 list of The Best Restaurants on the Upper East Side.

It was one of only five restaurants awarded four stars by The New York Times, however it was downgraded to three stars by restaurant critic Pete Wells.

It is two-star rated by the Michelin Guide.

In October 2019, Forbes magazine rated Daniel "top-ranked restaurant in America".

See also
 List of Michelin starred restaurants in New York City

References

External links

Restaurants in Manhattan
Restaurants established in 1993
Upper East Side
Michelin Guide starred restaurants in New York (state)
French restaurants in New York City
1993 establishments in New York City
James Beard Foundation Award winners
Fine dining